The 2022–23 season is the 147th season in the existence of Middlesbrough Football Club and the club's sixth consecutive season in the Championship. In addition to the league, they will also compete in the 2022–23 FA Cup and the 2022–23 EFL Cup.

Statistics

Players with names in italics and marked * were on loan from another club for the whole of their season with Middlesbrough

|-
|colspan="12" style="text-align:center;" |Out on loan
|-

|-
|colspan="12" style="text-align:center;" |No longer at the club

|}

Goals record

Assists

Disciplinary record

Transfers

In

Out

Loans in

Loans out

Pre-season and friendlies
On 25 May, Middlesbrough announced their pre-season plans with fixtures against Bishop Auckland (originally 25 June, later moved to 2 July), Morecambe and a training camp in Portugal. A day later, a trip to York City was added to the calendar. A fourth friendly, against Whitby Town was confirmed on May 31. In June, a friendly against Braga in Portugal was next to be added to the schedule. A sixth pre-season friendly was confirmed against Olympique de Marseille at home on July 22.

A mid-season friendly during the 2022 FIFA World Cup winter break against Hibernian was announced.

Competitions

Championship

League table

Results summary

Results by round

Matches

On 23 June, the league fixtures were announced.

FA Cup

Boro entered the FA Cup in the third round and were drawn at home to Brighton & Hove Albion.

EFL Cup

Middlesbrough were drawn at home to Barnsley in the first round.

References

Middlesbrough
Middlesbrough F.C. seasons
English football clubs 2022–23 season